Neolissochilus blanci is a species of cyprinid in the genus Neolissochilus. It inhabits Laos.

References

Cyprinidae
Cyprinid fish of Asia